Charles Thomas Marvin (1854–1890), writer on Russia.

Marvin was born at Plumstead, Kent, in 1854. In 1868 he was employed in a warehouse in Watling Street, London. At the age of sixteen he went to Russia to join his father, who was assistant-manager of an engineering works on the Neva. He remained in Russia for six years (1870–6) and acquired a good knowledge of the Russian language. For eighteen months he was the correspondent of The Globe and Traveller at Saint Petersburg. Returning to London, on 10 January 1876, after passing the civil service examination, he was appointed as a temporary writer at the Custom House. In May that year he was transferred to the Inland Revenue at Somerset House and then to the Post Office; he later returned to the Custom House. On 16 July 1877 he entered the Foreign Office as a copying clerk. On 29 May 1878 he was employed to make a copy of a secret treaty with Russia, the "Anglo Russian Convention of 30th May 1878". The same evening he supplied The Globe and Traveller with a from memory summary of the treaty. On 1 June Lord Salisbury, the then Foreign Secretary, faced with the alternative of admitting the secret deal, said in the House of Lords that this summary was "wholly unworthy of their lordships' confidence". On 14 June The Globe printed a complete text of the treaty which Marvin had again provided from memory. 

On 26 June Marvin was arrested, but was released on 16 July after it was found that he had committed no offence known to English law. His actions prompted a tightening of internal regulations that eventually led to the enactment in 1889 of Britain's first Official Secrets legislation.

In 1878 Marvin published Our Public Offices, Embodying an Account of the Disclosure of the Anglo-Russian Agreement, and the Unrevealed Secret Treaty of 31 May 1878. During the Russo-Turkish war in 1878 he contributed to twenty publications.

In 1880 he published his first book on the Russo-Indian question, The Eye-witnesses' Account of the Disastrous Campaign against the Akhal Tekke Turcomans, which was adopted by the Russian government for the military libraries and commended by General Mikhail Skobelev. In 1881 he printed Merv the Queen of the World and the Scourge of the Man-stealing Turcomans. With an Exposition on the Khorassan Question, in which he predicted that the next Russian advance would be pushed to Panjdeh. In 1882 he was sent to Russia by Joseph Cowen, M.P., to interview the principal generals and statesmen on the Russo-Indian question. On his return he wrote The Russian Advance towards India: Conversations with Skobeleff, Ignatieff, and other Russian Generals and Statesmen on the Central Asian Question. The following year he proceeded to Caucasus and explored the Russian petroleum region. An account of this was published in 1884, in The Region of the Eternal Fire: an Account of a Journey to the Petroleum Region of the Caspian. Written in a popularist style, it underwent several reprintings into the early 1890s. The best-known of his works is The Russians at the Gates of Herat, 1885, a book of two hundred pages, written and published within a week, which circulated sixty-five thousand copies.

He died at Grosvenor House, Plumstead Common, Kent, on 4 Dec. 1890 and was buried in Plumstead new cemetery on 10 December.

Works
Besides the works already mentioned he wrote:
 ‘The Russians at Merv and Herat, and their Power of Invading India,’ 1883.
 ‘The Petroleum of the Future; Baku, the Petrolia of Europe,’ 1883.
 ‘Reconnoitering Central Asia, Pioneering Adventures in the Region lying between Russia and India,’ 1884.
 ‘The Railway Race to Herat. An Account of the Russian Railway to Herat and India,’ 1885.
 ‘Shall Russia have Penjdeh?’ 1885.
 ‘Russia's Power of Attacking India;’ tenth thousand, 1886.
 ‘The Petroleum Question. The Coming Deluge of Russian Petroleum,’ 1886.
 ‘The Petroleum Question. England as a Petroleum Power,’ 1887.
 ‘The Petroleum Question. Our unappreciated Petroleum Empire,’ 1889.
and translated Colonel Grodekoff's ‘Ride from Samarcand to Herat,’ 1880.

References

 

1854 births
1890 deaths
19th-century British writers
People from Plumstead